The Battle of Hennersdorf, sometimes referred to as Catholic-Hennersdorf, was a minor encounter that took place on November 23, 1745 in Katholisch-Hennersdorf in Silesia (Prussia, present-day Poland) during the Second Silesian War (part of the War of the Austrian Succession). The Prussians under Frederick II defeated the Austrians under Prince Charles Alexander of Lorraine. The Prussians  surprised the Austrians and Saxons in their cantonments in Lusatia with the most success at Hennersdorf. There a force of two regiments of hussars and two regiments of cuirassiers under Zieten attacked a small force of two battalions of Saxon infantry and three regiments of Saxon cavalry. The Saxons, after making a desperate stand, were overwhelmed by the arrival of additional Prussian cavalry, infantry and artillery.

References

External links
 

Battles of the War of the Austrian Succession
Battles involving Prussia
Battles involving Austria
Battle of Hennersdorf
Battles of the Silesian Wars
Battles of Frederick the Great
History of Lower Silesian Voivodeship